Ezoa en Niet Anders is the fourth album by 't Hof van Commerce.

Track listing

 "Oed Under Grjid"
 "Niemand Grodder"
 "Zonder Fans Gin Bands"
 "Jaloes"
 "Skit Omoage (En Kopt Drip)"
 "Lop Mo Deure"
 "Achter 8 Jaer"
 "20 Frang Da Aufgeplakt"
 "Leegaert", with Brahim
 "Super Commerce Bros.", with Nina Babet, Peter Lesage
 "In De Rayoeng", with Balo, Gabriel Ríos, Riemeloare, TLP
 "Ik Wil U Geld"
 "Borsjt", with Lazy Horse
 "Gisterenaevend Laete"
 "Driekartkilo Tekstn", with Spok (5), Statiek
 "Van De Fakteur"
 "Oei Gin Vlams Verstaet"

Chart positions

References

External links
Discogs album info

2005 albums
't Hof van Commerce albums